Per J. Husabø (6 May 1928 – 3 March 2012) was a Norwegian politician for the Christian Democratic Party.

Husabø was born in Leikanger.  He was elected to the Norwegian Parliament from Sogn og Fjordane in 1977, and was re-elected on one occasion. He had previously served as a deputy representative during the term 1973–1977.

On the local level he was a member of Leikanger municipal council from 1967 to 1975. From 1975 to 1979 he was a deputy member of Sogn og Fjordane county council. He chaired the local party chapter from 1974 to 1976.  He died, aged 83, in his native town of Leikanger.

References

1928 births
2012 deaths
Members of the Storting
Sogn og Fjordane politicians
Christian Democratic Party (Norway) politicians
Norwegian College of Agriculture alumni
Academic staff of the Norwegian College of Agriculture
20th-century Norwegian politicians
People from Leikanger